Piano Jazz is a weekly one-hour radio show produced and distributed by National Public Radio (NPR). It began on June 4, 1978, and was hosted by jazz pianist Marian McPartland (1918–2013) until 2011. It is the longest-running cultural program on NPR. The show generally features a single guest (though small groups and duos are also featured at times), and usually consists of about an equal mixture of discussion and playing, often duets with McPartland. Initially the guests were limited to jazz pianists, but the format was later expanded to include performers on other instruments as well as other genres (though the performances remain focused on jazz tunes). The show provides an inside look at the relationships of jazz musicians, since McPartland often had long friendships with many of her guests. Piano Jazz won a Peabody Award in 1983. The show is an exclusive production of South Carolina public radio on WLTR and is offered nationally by NPR.

A number of shows have been released commercially on CD or LP, including shows with Dizzy Gillespie, Bill Evans, Bruce Hornsby, Mary Lou Williams, Shirley Horn, Steely Dan Milt Hinton, Kenny Burrell, Lionel Hampton and Les McCann. These were released on The Jazz Alliance, a subsidiary of Concord Records founded around 1990 for this purpose.

On November 10, 2011, NPR announced the retirement of Marian McPartland from the program. Jon Weber stepped into McPartland's shoes, recording 13 episodes for the renamed Piano Jazz Rising Stars, broadcast in early 2012 and 2013. It features mainly young musicians such as Whitney James, Jason Moran, Taylor Eigsti and Grace Kelly. McPartland's Piano Jazz continues as a series of rebroadcasts of old programs, with Piano Jazz Rising Stars becoming a separate program.

Program log: guest list
(This is a list of recording dates in year-month-day format for the sessions listed; when the exact date is unknown, 00 is used as a placeholder)

1970s

1980s

1990s

2000s

2010s

Date unknown

References

External links
 The Sweet and Lovely Legacy of Marian McPartland
 
 Marian McPartland's Piano Jazz via streaming audio

American jazz radio programs
NPR programs
Peabody Award-winning radio programs
1970s American radio programs
1980s American radio programs
1990s American radio programs
2000s American radio programs
2010s American radio programs
Works about pianos and pianists
1978 radio programme debuts